Phryno is a genus of flies in the family Tachinidae.

Species
P. brevicornis Tachi, 2013
P. jilinensis (Sun, 1993)
P. koreana Tachi, 2013
P. nepalensis Tachi, 2013
P. tenuiforceps Tachi, 2013
P. tibialis (Sun, 1993)
P. vetula (Meigen, 1824)
P. yichengica Chao & Liu, 1998

References

Exoristinae
Diptera of Europe
Diptera of Asia
Tachinidae genera
Taxa named by Jean-Baptiste Robineau-Desvoidy